Roy Harwood Billing  (born 1947) is a New Zealand television actor, now based on Waiheke Island, New Zealand. He was brought up in Ruawai, Northland, New Zealand. Billing spent almost three decades living and working in Australia. He became widely known for his role as organised-crime boss “Aussie Bob” Trimbole in the TV series Underbelly.

Career
In 1965 Billing formed a psychedelic rock band called The Ministry of Fog. After a short period at university doing a science degree, he dropped out and got a job at Inland Revenue. After three years he moved into advertising, joining Auckland agencies Jacka Brown and later, McCann Erickson. “For a long time, I was stuck in accounts when I really wanted to be in creative.” 

After hobby stints in amateur theatre and Theatre Corporate, founding director Raymond Hawthorne offered him a job with a state theatre program, Theatre in Education, working with high schools throughout the North Island. Billing left advertising to take up the less lucrative new role, at the age of 30. It was the beginning of his life as an actor.

"Looking back now, I don’t know how I managed it. Theatre in Education was actually quite a hard job. We travelled around the country going to schools and trying to engage students in the concepts of drama, and of course they didn’t want to know about it."

Billing has starred in many television shows and had main roles on Bad Cop, Bad Cop, Dossa and Joe and Hell Has Harbour Views. Billing also had a recurring role on Blue Heelers as Senior Constable Ian Goss, on Always Greener as Eddie McGill, in Packed to the Rafters as Ron Barrett, and in Under the Mountain. In 2000 he featured in the film The Dish, a comedy about the moon landings, portraying the Mayor of Parkes. He also appeared as part of the ensemble on the 2006 season of Thank God You're Here. He has had a guest role on All Saints.

From 2012 Billing has played Harry Strang in the Jack Irish television drama series and television movies adapted from the detective novels by Peter Temple.

In 2009, Billing played Griffith drug lord Robert Trimbole in the high-rating drama series Underbelly: A Tale of Two Cities, starring alongside Matthew Newton. He also starred in the film Charlie and Boots. Billing played the part of Chief Dufflepud in the 2010 film The Chronicles of Narnia: The Voyage of the Dawn Treader as well as a recurring character in the Nine Network police drama Cops L.A.C..

He started acting with Theatre Corporate, Auckland in the late 1970s. Early roles in New Zealand were in Sea Urchins a 1980-84 New Zealand TV series, the 1982 films The Scarecrow and Beyond Reasonable Doubt, the 1985 film Came a Hot Friday, and as Captain Gordon Vette in the 1988 miniseries Erebus: The Aftermath.

In 2013, he appeared in the New Zealand television comedy Agent Anna, for which he agreed to be paid at New Zealand rates.

In 2020, Billing starred in the Australian comedy-drama film Never Too Late.

Billing returned to New Zealand to live in late 2019.

Awards

In 1999, Billing was nominated in the 'Best Actor in a Supporting Role' award at the AFI Awards for his role in Siam Sunset. In 2009, Billing won the 'Best Actor in a Television Drama' award at the AFI Awards, and was nominated for the 'Outstanding Actor' award at the 2010 Logies for his role in Underbelly.

Billing's career achievements were honoured in 2009 when he was inducted into the Australian Film Walk of Fame.

On 26 January 2015, Billing was awarded the Medal of the Order of Australia for "service to the performing arts, particularly as an actor, and to the community".

In 2015, Billing became the first person to be honoured with a star on Winton's Walk of Fame which was revealed during The Vision Splendid Outback Film Festival in Winton, Queensland.

Charity work
Billing is a national ambassador for the cancer charity Dry July and has supported the charity for over 4 years.

Filmography

References

External links

 
 Roy Billing at NZ On Screen
 Courting With Justice documentary 
Interview from New Zealand Listener of 2 August 2003, pages 12-13
Photo of Roy Billing (right) in Underbelly
Roy Billing - Actor Profile

1947 births
20th-century New Zealand male actors
21st-century New Zealand male actors
Living people
AACTA Award winners
New Zealand emigrants to Australia
Australian male television actors
Australian male film actors
New Zealand male stage actors
People from the Kaipara District
Recipients of the Medal of the Order of Australia
New Zealand comedians
New Zealand male comedians